The Silence of the Lambs is a 1988 psychological horror novel by Thomas Harris. Published August 29, 1988, it is the sequel to Harris's 1981 novel Red Dragon. Both novels feature the cannibalistic serial killer Dr. Hannibal Lecter, this time pitted against FBI Special Agent Clarice Starling. Its film adaptation directed by Jonathan Demme was released in 1991 to widespread critical acclaim and box office success. It won the Academy Award for Best Picture.

Synopsis 
Clarice Starling, a young FBI trainee, is asked to carry out an errand by Jack Crawford, the head of the FBI division that draws up psychological profiles of serial killers. Starling is to present a questionnaire to the brilliant forensic psychiatrist and cannibalistic serial killer, Hannibal Lecter. Lecter is serving nine consecutive life sentences in a Maryland mental institution for a series of murders.

Crawford's real intention, however, is to try to solicit Lecter's assistance in the hunt for a serial killer dubbed "Buffalo Bill", whose M.O. involves kidnapping large women, starving them for up to two weeks, killing and skinning them, and dumping the remains in nearby rivers. The nickname was started by Kansas City Homicide as a sick joke that "he likes to skin his humps." Throughout the investigation, Starling periodically returns to Lecter in search of information, and the two form a strange relationship in which he offers her cryptic clues in return for information about her troubled and bleak childhood as an orphan.

When Bill's sixth victim is found in West Virginia, Starling helps Crawford perform the autopsy. Starling finds a pupa in the throat of the victim, and just as Lecter predicted, she has been scalped. Triangular patches of skin have also been taken from her shoulders. Furthermore, autopsy reports indicate that Bill had killed her within four days of her capture, much faster than his earlier victims. Starling takes the pupa to the Smithsonian, where it is initially identified as the black witch moth, a species that does not naturally occur where the victim was found, though later it is identified as the Death's-head Moth, an even more exotic species that would have to be reared in captivity from imported eggs.

On the basis of Lecter's prediction, Starling believes that he knows who Buffalo Bill really is. She asks Crawford why she was sent to fish for information on Buffalo Bill without being told she was doing so; Crawford claims that if she had had an agenda, Lecter would have sensed it and never spoken up.

In Tennessee, Catherine Baker Martin, daughter of Senator Ruth Martin, is kidnapped. Within six hours, her blouse is found on the roadside, slit up the back: Buffalo Bill's calling card. He traps her in an oubliette and begins to starve her. Crawford is advised that no less than the President of the United States has expressed "intense interest" in the case, and that a successful rescue is preferable. Crawford estimates they have three days before Catherine is killed. Starling is sent to Lecter with the offer of a deal: if he assists in Catherine's rescue and Buffalo Bill's capture, he will be transferred out of the asylum, something he has continually longed for. Lecter expresses skepticism at the genuineness of the offer, but he does not believe that Starling would intentionally lie to him.

After Starling leaves, Lecter reminisces on the past, recalling a conversation with Benjamin Raspail, a former patient whom he had eventually murdered. During therapy sessions, Raspail told Lecter about a former lover, Jame Gumb: After Raspail left Gumb and began dating a sailor named Klaus, Gumb became jealous and murdered Klaus, using his skin to make an apron. Raspail also revealed that Gumb had an epiphany upon watching a butterfly hatch.

Lecter's ruminations are interrupted when Dr. Frederick Chilton—the asylum's administrator and Lecter's self-styled nemesis—steps in. A listening device allowed him to record Starling's offer, and Chilton has found out that Crawford's deal is a lie. He offers one of his own: If Lecter reveals Buffalo Bill's identity, he will indeed get a transfer to another asylum, but only if Chilton gets credit for getting the information from him. Lecter agrees, but insists that he be allowed to give the information to Senator Martin in person, in Tennessee. Unbeknown to Chilton, Lecter has secretly collected the ingredients for an improvised handcuff lockpick, which he deduces will be useful at some point during the travel.

In Tennessee, Lecter toys with Senator Martin briefly, enjoying the woman's anguish, but eventually gives her some information about Buffalo Bill: his name is William "Billy" Rubin, and he has suffered from "elephant ivory anthrax", a knifemaker's disease. He also provides an accurate physical description. The name, however, is a red herring: bilirubin is a pigment in human bile and a chief coloring agent in human feces, which the forensic lab compares to the color of Chilton's hair.

Starling tries one last time to get information from Lecter as he is held in police custody. He offers a final clue—"we covet what we see every day"—and demands to hear her worst memory. Starling reveals that, after her father's death, she was sent to live with a cousin on a sheep and horse ranch. One night, she discovered the farmer slaughtering the spring lambs, and fled in terror with a mare also destined for the slaughterhouse whom she named Hannah. The farmer caught her and sent her to an orphanage, where she spent the rest of her childhood. Lecter, seeing the parallels between the helpless lambs and the equally helpless Catherine, thanks her for her candor, and the two share a brief moment of connection before Chilton forces her to leave. Shortly after this, Lecter escapes by killing and eviscerating his guards, using one of their faces as a mask to fool paramedics.

Starling continues her search for Buffalo Bill, deducing that he knew his first victim, Fredrica Bimmel, from everyday life. She visits Fredrica's family home and discovers that both she and Buffalo Bill were accomplished tailors and is killing the women in order to make a 'suit' for himself, having come to believe he was transsexual despite this self-diagnosis consistently being deemed false by doctors, causing him to be rejected for sexual reassignment surgery by multiple hospitals. By canvassing Bimmel's known associates, she ends up at the house of one Jame Gumb, a dressmaker and leatherworker. She spies a Death's-head moth in his home and knows whom she has found; however, Gumb escapes into his basement. Starling, armed only with a revolver but aware that calling for backup will result in Catherine's death, follows him down, and kills him after a protracted chase. Catherine is returned to her family physically unharmed.

Lecter then writes a congratulatory letter to Starling, in which he hopes that "the lambs have stopped screaming" and indicates that he has no plans to pursue her. He also predicts correctly that saving Catherine Martin may have granted Clarice some relief, but that the silence will never become eternal, heralding her motives for a continued career at the FBI. The novel ends with Clarice sleeping peacefully "in the silence of the lambs".

Characters 
 Clarice Starling
 Dr. Hannibal Lecter
 Jack Crawford
 Jame "Buffalo Bill" Gumb
 Dr. Frederick Chilton
 Catherine Baker Martin
 Sen. Ruth Martin
 Ardelia Mapp
 Barney
 John Brigham
 Albert Roden
 Noble Pilcher
 Paul Krendler
 I. J. Miggs
 Alonzo
 Sammie
 Jeff

Literary significance 
The novel was a great success. Children's novelist Roald Dahl  greatly enjoyed the novel, describing it as "subtle, horrific and splendid, the best book I have read in a long time". Author David Foster Wallace used the book as part of his curriculum while teaching at Pomona College and later included the book, as well as Harris's  Red Dragon, on his list of ten favorite novels. John Dunning says of Silence of the Lambs: [it is] "simply the best thriller I've read in five years".

Some critics and transgender activists decried the novel as transphobic and homophobic because of its portrayal of Buffalo Bill. Because of this there were protests against the film version when it was released. The book was criticized by feminist author Julia Serano for presenting transsexualism as psychosis, despite Harris' insistence in the text that Jame Gumb was not a true transsexual.

Accolades 
 The novel won the 1988 Bram Stoker Award for Best Novel.
 The novel also won the 1989 Anthony Award for Best Novel.
 It was nominated for the 1989 World Fantasy Award.

Film adaptation 

Following the 1986 adaptation of Red Dragon (filmed as Manhunter), The Silence of the Lambs was adapted by Jonathan Demme in 1991. The Silence of the Lambs became the third film in Oscar history to win the following five  Academy Awards: Best Picture, Best Director, Best Screenplay, Best Actor and Best Actress. It stars Jodie Foster as Clarice Starling and Anthony Hopkins as Hannibal Lecter.

Musical adaptation 
In 2005, comedian-musicians Jon and Al Kaplan parodied the story, especially the film, in Silence! The Musical. It premiered Off-Off-Broadway and has since had productions in London and Los Angeles. In 2012, the Los Angeles production won the Los Angeles Drama Critics Circle awards for Score, Lead Performance, and Choreography.

Series adaptation 
A series called Clarice, which was created by Jenny Lumet and Alex Kurtzman, aired on CBS in 2021. The series takes place three years after the events of the 1991 film adaptation of the novel, and it stars Rebecca Breeds as Clarice Starling. It was canceled after one season.

References

External links 

1988 American novels
American novels adapted into films
American novels adapted into television shows
American thriller novels
Fiction set in 1983
St. Martin's Press books
Hannibal Lecter novels
Novels about the Federal Bureau of Investigation
Novels about cannibalism
Sequel novels
Anthony Award-winning works
Novels about serial killers
Novels set in Baltimore
Novels set in Maryland
Novels set in Memphis, Tennessee
Novels set in Washington, D.C.
Novels set in West Virginia
Grand Prix de Littérature Policière winners
LGBT-related horror literature
Novels with transgender themes
LGBT-related controversies in literature
Bram Stoker Award for Novel winners